

Largest Internet providers in the United States
AT&T Internet Services
Sparklight
Lumen Technologies
Charter Communications
Comcast High Speed Internet (also known as Xfinity)
Consolidated Communications (including FairPoint Communications and SureWest)
Cox Communications
Frontier Communications
Mediacom
TDS Telecom
Windstream (including Earthlink)
Verizon High Speed Internet

Residential – fewer than one million subscribers 
Armstrong Zoom
Atlas Networks
B2X Online - VA
Bernard Telephone Co
BluePeak (Vast)
Breezeline
Cincinnati Bell
Comelec
ComTecCloud
CS Technologies, Inc.
Exede Internet
Google Fiber
Greenlight Networks
Honest Networks
Hotwire Communications
HughesNet
Interlync Internet Services
ImOn Communications
IVNet, LLP
Midcontinent Communications
Monkeybrains.net
MV Link
netBlazr
Planet Networks
RCN Corporation (acquired by TPG)
Rise Broadband
Shentel
Sonic.net
WirelessBuy
South Slope
Sprint (including Clearwire)
Starry Internet
Ting Internet
Twin Lakes (Tennessee)
United Communications (TN)
USA Communications
PenTeleData
WideOpenWest (wow!)
Viser
Ziply Fiber

Business
Aptech Networks
Atlas Networks
B2X Online - VA
Broadview
CenturyLink
Cogent Communications
Digital West
Everstream Fiber
 Google Fiber
Hotwire Communications
Hurricane Electric
Interlync Internet Services
IT7 Networks
MegaPath
Skyriver
Ting Internet
Towerstream
Stealth Communications
Windstream
Viser
Ziply Fiber

References